Jaime Guerra (born 20 January 1963) is a Mexican equestrian. He competed at the 1992 Summer Olympics and the 1996 Summer Olympics.

References

External links
 

1963 births
Living people
Mexican male equestrians
Olympic equestrians of Mexico
Equestrians at the 1992 Summer Olympics
Equestrians at the 1996 Summer Olympics
Pan American Games medalists in equestrian
Pan American Games bronze medalists for Mexico
Equestrians at the 1987 Pan American Games
Place of birth missing (living people)
Medalists at the 1987 Pan American Games